Buzzkunst is the sole album by UK group ShelleyDevoto. The studio album reunited Pete Shelley and Howard Devoto, founding members of the punk group Buzzcocks and was their first collaboration since the 1970s.

Track listing 
All music written by Howard Devoto and Pete Shelley. All lyrics by Howard Devoto.

Videos were recorded live at 'Irregular' in London on 9 February 2000.

Personnel 
ShelleyDevoto
 Pete Shelley – vocals, producer
 Howard Devoto – vocals, producer
with:
 Harrison Smith – tenor and soprano saxophone on "On Solids"
 Kay Hoffnung – backing vocals on "Self-Destruction"

References 

2001 debut albums
ShelleyDevoto albums
Cooking Vinyl albums